José Rolando Serrano Lazaro (13 November 1938 – 13 June 2022) was a Colombian footballer who played as a midfielder.

Career
Serrano helped the Colombia national team qualify for its first ever World Cup: 1962 FIFA World Cup. It lost both its first and third group stage matches, but drew the Soviet Union team under 1960 European Football Championship winning coach Gavriil Kachalin. He also competed for Colombia in the 1963 South American Championship.

After retiring from playing, Serrano was appointed the manager of local club Cúcuta Deportivo in January 1982.

Serrano died on 13 June 2022, aged 83.

References

1938 births
2022 deaths
Colombian footballers
Association football midfielders
Colombia international footballers
1962 FIFA World Cup players
Cúcuta Deportivo footballers
América de Cali footballers
Unión Magdalena footballers
Millonarios F.C. players
Colombian football managers
Cúcuta Deportivo managers
People from Pamplona, Norte de Santander